The Occupied Territories Bill (officially Control of Economic Activity (Occupied Territories) Bill 2018) is a proposed Irish law that would ban and criminalize "trade with and economic support for illegal settlements in territories deemed occupied under international law", most notably Israeli settlements in Israeli-occupied territories. Violators would face fines of up to €250,000 and up to five years in prison.

Support and opposition
The bill was tabled in the Oireachtas by independent senator Frances Black in January 2018, who stated that "trade in settlement goods sustains injustice". She consulted Sadaka, Trócaire, Christian Aid, Amnesty International, the Irish Congress of Trade Unions (ICTU) and the Global Legal Action Network (GLAN) during the drafting process. It was supported by the parties Fianna Fáil, Sinn Féin, the Labour Party, Solidarity–People Before Profit, the Green Party, the Social Democrats, and independents. It has also been supported by the Ireland Palestine Solidarity Campaign. The bill has been passed by majorities in both the Seanad (upper house) and the Dáil (lower house). Fianna Fáil foreign affairs spokesperson Niall Collins introduced the bill in the Dáil, saying that his party's support was due to "[increasing concern] about the actions of Israel and its continued and blatant disregard for international law". Sinn Féin's strong showing in the 2020 Irish general election led to speculation that the bill would be advanced by the new government, although the bill was not an election issue. Sinn Fein and Fianna Fail both indicated in their manifestos that they wish to see the Occupied Territories Bill enacted.

The Fine Gael party has opposed the bill. Former Irish Fine Gael politician Alan Shatter, in an opinion piece for the Jerusalem Post noted that, even if the bill is passed, the foreign ministry could decline to implement it. In December 2019, Foreign Minister Simon Coveney, on a trip to Israel, said that the government had "effectively blocked" the bill.

Potential effects

Trócaire estimates that, Irish imports from Israeli settlements amount to between €500,000 and €1,500,000 each year, out of €50 million total Irish imports. Ireland has a $1 billion trade surplus with Israel, exporting more than $1.2 billion to the country in 2018.

The bill would ban any goods or services produced, even partially, in the Israeli-occupied territories—including the Golan Heights—or by Israelis who travel, even temporarily, beyond the Green Line. It affects goods or services imported to Ireland as well as the transactions of Irish citizens, Irish companies, and companies with Irish subsidiaries worldwide. The effects of this would cause companies operating in Israel, Ireland and the United States to choose between obeying the Irish law or United States anti-boycott legislation. Especially considering that Ireland is a tax haven for many tech companies, from which the Irish government collects billions in corporate tax, the legislation has the potential to encourage some of them to relocate operations, according to a Bloomberg editorial and the Lawfare Project.

According to foreign minister  Simon Coveney—relying on legal advice from the Attorney General of Ireland, Séamus Woulfe—the law could result in Ireland being fined by the European Union for violating EU trade regulation. Woulfe also said that the law would be "quite vague" and impractical to enforce. The Lawfare Project is already preparing a lawsuit against the legislation on the grounds that it violates European Union law.  The Ireland Palestine Alliance, Sadaka, noting that one key argument by Coveney and the Government is that the Bill is not compatible with EU law, point to a legal opinion by Takis Tridimas, Professor of EU law at King's College London and practising EU lawyer, that the Bill is compatible with EU law. Other legal authorities, including former Attorney General Michael McDowell argue that the bill would not contravene existing law or international obligations. Trócaire cites two formal legal opinions that the bill is legal and permissible under EU law.

Jackie Goodall of the Ireland Israel Alliance stated that Christian pilgrims could be adversely affected, as taking tours guided by Jews based in the West Bank or buying souvenirs from Jews in the West Bank would be a criminal action.

International reaction
Various American officials contacted Coveney, warning that commercial relations between their countries could be adversely affected by the passage of the bill. Several politicians from Massachusetts—a state with a large Irish-American population—have criticized the bill. This includes criticism from Steven S. Howitt, a state representative, Boston Mayor Marty Walsh, and Mintz Levin chairman Robert Popeo, who characterized the bill as antisemitic. Indiana's Secretary of Commerce, James A. Schellinger, expressed concern that the bill would "unfairly target certain countries or groups of people" and harm Indiana businesses. In a letter signed by ten United States Members of Congress, signatories warned of "potentially severe implications" to Ireland's economy. Fianna Fáil foreign affairs spokesman Niall Collins characterized this as a "veiled threat to Ireland". In response, the Taoiseach Leo Varadkar wrote to members of the House of Representatives emphasizing his government's opposition to the bill.

The Israeli embassy in Ireland called the bill "immoral" and stated that "Closing doors will not in any way facilitate Ireland's role and influence." Defence minister Avigdor Lieberman proposed shuttering Israel's embassy in Dublin. Benjamin Netanyahu, the Prime Minister of Israel, stated that the bill is "utterly contrary to the principles of free trade and justice". Isaac Herzog wrote to Coveney, stating that the legislation "sets a dangerous precedent which is detrimental to the relations between our countries and to the chances of resolving the Israel Palestinian conflict by a negotiated compromise". He warned that the boycott might extend into Israel's 1948 borders, as most Irish people are not familiar with the intricacies of the Israeli-Palestinian conflict.

It has been characterized as "BDS bill" in Jewish and Israeli media. An editorial in The Jerusalem Post criticized the omission of other territories considered occupied under international law in the debate over the bill, such as Turkish Cyprus, Western Sahara, and the Crimea. According to Trocaire the legislation would apply to territories where there is a clear international legal consensus on the status of the occupation. Currently only the occupied Palestinian territories have been confirmed as occupied by the International Court of Justice but it allows for other territories to be included so long as there is consensus between the Minister for Foreign Affairs & Trade and both houses of the Oireachtas.

References

External links
Oireachtas website, with progress updates, debates, and full text

Boycott, Divestment and Sanctions
Proposed laws of Ireland
2018 in Irish law
Ireland–Israel relations
2019 in Irish law